Lasbordes may refer to:

 Lasbordes, Aude, France
 Toulouse – Lasbordes Airport, serving Toulouse